Ephrin B1 is a protein that in humans is encoded by the EFNB1 gene. It is a member of the ephrin family. The encoded protein is a type I membrane protein and a ligand of Eph-related receptor tyrosine kinases. It may play a role in cell adhesion and function in the development or maintenance of the nervous system.

Clinical significance 
Mutations in this protein are responsible for most cases of craniofrontonasal syndrome.

Interactions
EFNB1 has been shown to interact with SDCBP.

References

Further reading

External links 
 
 

Genes on human chromosome X